is a retired Japanese male backstroke swimmer. He represented Japan at the 1996 Summer Olympics in Atlanta, Georgia. He is best known for winning a silver medal at the 1995 Summer Universiade in Fukuoka.

References
 sports-reference

1974 births
Living people
Olympic swimmers of Japan
Swimmers at the 1996 Summer Olympics
People from Osaka Prefecture
Asian Games medalists in swimming
Asian Games bronze medalists for Japan
Japanese male backstroke swimmers
Medalists at the 1994 Asian Games
Universiade medalists in swimming
Swimmers at the 1994 Asian Games
Universiade silver medalists for Japan
Medalists at the 1995 Summer Universiade
20th-century Japanese people
21st-century Japanese people